John Edward Geake (22 April 1925 – 3 June 1998) was a British astronomer, noted as a lunar scientist, and scientific instrument designer.

Career 

His postgraduate studies at UMIST related to the study of astronomical spectra using a photoelectric photometer. His work parallelled that of Hiltner (1914–1991) and his group in U.S.A.; although at the time, neither knew of the other's work, and their methods were different. This research (which was long before the days of space exploration) led to laboratory measurement of luminescence from meteorite samples, which could be compared with lunar luminescence in an attempt to determine the composition of the lunar surface.

His expertise was recognised by both the American and the Soviet space agencies, both of whom allocated to him lunar samples for study. He was a NASA principal investigator, and an editor of Lunar Science Conference Proceedings. One of his interests was in trying to gain information from the polarization of light scattered from the surfaces of solid bodies in the Solar System. This involved comparison of laboratory measurements on samples of known characteristics against astronomical observations. This led to analysis of data collected by the Pioneer 10 and Pioneer 11 spacecraft (targeted at Jupiter and Saturn), which was unfinished at his death. It was continued by Tom Gehrels of the University of Arizona; where Geake had held the post of adjunct professor.

Refractometer inventions 

Geake invented the first linear direct-reading refractometer for liquids, which is said to have found many practical applications. He designed the "UMIST Refractometer" subsystem for the Cassini–Huygens probe, which reached Saturn's moon Titan after his death in 2004. He also invented a spectral differentiating refractometer.

Family and death 

Geake worked in UMIST physics department for 35 years. He died on 3 June 1998 after retiring in 1992 with the title of reader. In his private life, he was a devout Christian Scientist, and a visiting chaplain at Strangeways Prison. He was survived by his wife, Mary, and their two daughters. The archaeologist Helen Geake (born 1967) is his cousin.

Honours 

The main-belt asteroid 9298 Geake, discovered by Edward Bowell at Anderson Mesa Station in 1985, was named in his honour.

References

External links 
 BAA Meeting at Manchester Metropolitan University April 1996
 Obituary by Michael Woolfson
 Reflectance polarimetry of Callisto and the evolution of the Galilean, Jean-ClaudeMandeville, John E.Geake and Audouin Dollfus (1978)
 The Cassini-Huygens Mission – Acknowledgements, Google books (2013)

1925 births
1998 deaths
Scientists from Manchester
20th-century British astronomers
Selenographers
20th-century cartographers